The Best College Football Player ESPY Award was presented annually between 1993 and 2001 to the collegiate American football player adjudged to be the best in the United States in a given calendar year.  The award was subsumed in 2002 by the Best Male College Athlete ESPY Award.

The award voting panel comprised variously fans; sportswriters and broadcasters, sports executives, and retired sportspersons, termed collectively experts; and ESPN personalities from amongst choices selected by the ESPN Select Nominating Committee.  Inasmuch as the ESPY Awards ceremonies were conducted in February during the pendency of the award's existence, an award presented in a given year is for performance and achievements in the one year theretofore.

List of winners

See also
College football awards
Associated Press College Football Player of the Year Award
Heisman Memorial Trophy
Maxwell Award
Walter Camp Award

References

College football national player awards
ESPY Awards
Awards established in 1993
Awards disestablished in 2001